South Yaamba is a rural locality in the Rockhampton Region, Queensland, Australia.

History 
The locality takes its name from the town of Yaamba, which in turn took its name from the parish, which took its name from the pastoral run, named in 1860s by the pastoralist Peter Fitzallan MacDonald. It is believed to be an Aboriginal word meaning main camping ground.

References 

Suburbs of Rockhampton Region
Localities in Queensland